Yoël Armougom (born 5 June 1998) is a French footballer who plays as a left-back for Ligue 2 club Sochaux.

Professional career
Armougom joined SM Caen in 2016, arriving from Saint-Denis FC. Armogoum made his professional debut for SM Caen in a 1–0 Coupe de la Ligue over FC Lorient on 24 October 2017. He made his Ligue 1 debut in a 1–0 win over Troyes AC on 28 October 2017.

On 16 June 2022, Armougom signed a three-year contract with Sochaux.

Personal life
Armougom's father, Yoland, was a triple jumper of Malagasy descent.

Career statistics

Club

References

External links
 
 SM Caen Profile
 L'Equipe Profile

1998 births
Living people
Sportspeople from Saint-Denis, Réunion
Footballers from Réunion
French footballers
Association football defenders
Stade Malherbe Caen players
FC Sochaux-Montbéliard players
Ligue 1 players
Ligue 2 players
French sportspeople of Malagasy descent
People of Malagasy descent from Réunion
Black French sportspeople